is a Japanese manga anthology marketed to a seinen audience that was edited by Coamix and published weekly by Shinchosha from 2001 throughout 2010 and became monthly since 2011. The collected editions of their titles are published under the Bunch Comics imprint.

History
In 2000, Nobuhiko Horie, former editor-in-chief of Weekly Shōnen Jump, along with former Jump authors who worked under Horie such as Tetsuo Hara and Tsukasa Hojo, founded the manga editing company Coamix, with Shinchōsha acting as their business partner. The premiere issue of Coamix's Comic Bunch was published on May 15, 2001 (but dated May 29 on the cover). Prior to the publication of the actual first issue, Coamix released a free preview issue featuring illustrations and interviews with various artists. The magazine was originally published on Tuesday, but was changed to Friday from 2002 and onward.

In 2010, Shinchosha ceased publication of Weekly Comic Bunch with its September 10 issue (published on August 27). On the day of the final issue's publication, Shinchosha relaunched the official Comic Bunch website, announcing their plans to revive the magazine as a monthly publication titled Monthly Comic Bunch which later began publication on January 21, 2011. Coamix began publishing an unrelated manga anthology titled Monthly Comic Zenon, which debuted on October 25, 2010.

List of works

Weekly Comic Bunch (2001–2010) 
 Angel Heart by Tsukasa Hojo (2001–2010)
 Gau Gau Wāta by Umekawa Kazumi (2001–2004, continued in Comic Rex)
 Nemuri Kyoshirō by Yoshihiro Yanagawa (2001–2003)
 Sōten no Ken by Tetsuo Hara (2001–2010)
 Tsūkai!! My Home by Satoshi Ikezawa (2001)
 Brave Story by Yoichiro Ono (2003–2008)
 Concierge by Hideyuki Ishizeki (2003–2010)
 The President of Japan: Sakurazaka Mantarō by Yoshiki Hidaka (2003–2006)
 Akihabara@Deep by Makoto Akane (2005–2007)
 Shin Violence Jack by Go Nagai (2005–2008)
 Attack by Tsukasa Oshima (2006–2010)
 51 Ways to Save Her by Usamaru Furuya (2006–2007)
 Gu-Ra-Me! - Daisaishō no Ryōrinin written by Mitsuru Nishimura and drawn by Mitsuru Ohsaki (2006–2010)
 My Girl by Mizu Sahara (2006–2010)
 Ten no Haō - Hokuto no Ken Raō Gaiden by Yowkow Osada (2006–2007)
 Shirogane no Seija - Hokuto no Ken Toki Gaiden by Yuka Nagate (2007–2008)
 Sōkoku no Garō - Hokuto no Ken Rei Gaiden by Yasuyuki Nekoi (2007–2009)
 Btooom! by Jun'ya Inoue (2009–2018)
 Gokuaku no Hana - Hokuto no Ken Jagi Gaiden by Sin-ichi Hiromoto (2009)
 Miquiztli II - Taiyō no Shinigami by Kōji Maki (2009–2010)
 No Longer Human by Usamaru Furuya (2009–2010)
 Hōkō no Kumo - Hokuto no Ken Jūza Gaiden by Missile Kakurai (2010)

Monthly Comic Bunch (since 2011) 
 Lunatic Circus by Usamaru Furuya (2020–Present)
 Tosho Lin Kai by Usamaru Furuya (2021–2022)

Notes

References

External links 
  

2001 establishments in Japan
2010 disestablishments in Japan
Defunct magazines published in Japan
Weekly manga magazines published in Japan
Magazines established in 2001
Magazines disestablished in 2010
Seinen manga magazines
Shinchosha magazines
Magazines published in Tokyo